Christchurch by-election may refer to

New Zealand 
 1856 Town of Christchurch by-election
 1860 Town of Christchurch by-election
 1860 Christchurch Country by-elections
 1867 City of Christchurch by-election
 1870 City of Christchurch by-election
 1889 Christchurch North by-election
 1891 City of Christchurch by-election
 1896 City of Christchurch by-election
 1901 City of Christchurch by-election
 1911 Christchurch North by-election
 1936 Christchurch mayoral by-election
 1939 Christchurch South by-election
 1943 Christchurch East by-election
 1958 Christchurch mayoral by-election
 1979 Christchurch Central by-election
 2013 Christchurch East by-election

United Kingdom 
1844 Christchurch by-election
1932 New Forest and Christchurch by-election
 1952 Bournemouth East and Christchurch by-election
 1993 Christchurch by-election